The Sandžak faction or Sandžak lobby (Sandžački lobi), known in Bosnian as Sandžaklije, was one of the two main divisions of the Bosnian government and the ruling Party of Democratic Action during the Bosnian War (1992–95; see Republic of Bosnia and Herzegovina). It was made up of military hardliners and settlers (migrants) from Sandžak, a region divided between SR Serbia and SR Montenegro (see Bosniaks of Serbia and Bosniaks of Montenegro). Commander Sefer Halilović and politician Ejup Ganić belonged to the faction.

According to Sarajevan writer Željko Vuković, Sandžak immigrants controlled most of the municipal, political and military power during the war. On the eve of the war, some 160,000 people of Sandžak origin lived in Sarajevo. There is a view that Sandžak immigrants were prior to the war second-class citizens, who during the war climbed the social ladder.

Notable people

Sefer Halilović, military commander
Ramiz Dreković, military commander
Ejup Ganić, politician
Selmo Cikotić, military commander and politician
Ramiz Delalić, military commander
Fahrudin Radončić, politician

References

Sources

External links

Bosnian nationalism
Bosniak history
Political history of Bosnia and Herzegovina
Bosnian War
Party of Democratic Action